Kim Ji-jeong (born 4 May 1997) is a South Korean judoka.

She won the gold medal in the girls' 63 kg event at the 2013 Asian Youth Games held in Nanjing, China.

She participated at the 2018 World Judo Championships, winning a medal.

References

External links
 

1997 births
Living people
South Korean female judoka
21st-century South Korean women